Leopold De Salis may refer to:

Leopold Fane De Salis (1816–1898), New South Wales politician
Leopold William Jerome Fane De Salis (1845–1930), his son, New South Wales politician